57P/du Toit–Neujmin–Delporte is the designation of a periodic comet. It is a member of the Jupiter family of comets whose orbits and evolution are strongly influenced by the giant planet. In 2002 it was discovered to have broken up into at least 20 fragments. At the time of their discovery, these shed fragments were spread out along the orbital path subtending an angle of 27 arcminutes from the comet's surviving head.

Discovery 
The comet has many co-discoverers and a complicated discovery history due to unreliable communications during World War II. Daniel du Toit discovered the comet (retrospectively designated as P/1941 O1) on July 18, 1941, working at Boyden Station, South Africa. His cabled message about the comet did not reach his employer, Harvard College Observatory, until July 27. During a routine asteroid search, Grigory N. Neujmin (Simeis Observatory, Soviet Union) found the comet on a photographic plate exposed July 25. He confirmed his own observation on July 29, but the radiogram from Moscow took 20 days to reach Harvard. The official announcement of the new comet finally happened on August 20, 1941. A few days later, it became known that Eugène Joseph Delporte at the Royal Observatory, Belgium, also had found the comet on August 19, so he was added to the list of discoverers.

A few weeks later, news from Paul Ahnert at Sonneberg, Thuringia, Germany, reached Harvard that he also observed the new comet on July 22, but it was too late to recognize his contribution.

Fragment A was last observed in 2002.

References

External links 
 Orbital simulation from JPL (Java) / Horizons Ephemeris
 57P/du Toit-Neujmin-Delporte – Seiichi Yoshida @ aerith.net
 57P/du Toit–Neujmin–Delporte at Gary W. Kronk's Cometography

Periodic comets
0057
Split comets
Comets in 2015
19410718